"Kick Some Ass" is a song recorded by the American rock band Stroke 9. It was a single released from their 2002 album Rip It Off. The song peaked at #36 on the Billboard Alternative Songs chart on September 1, 2001.

"Kick Some Ass" was featured in the film Jay and Silent Bob Strike Back.

References

2001 singles
Stroke 9 songs
2001 songs
Universal Records singles